George William Bond (April 6, 1891 – May 14, 1974) was president of two public universities in Louisiana, Louisiana Tech in Ruston and Southeastern Louisiana University in Hammond, in the first half of the 20th century.

Background, education, and early life
Bond was born in Summers in Washington County in Northwest Arkansas to William Elijah Bond (1864-1953) and his wife, the former Martha Irene Simpson (1866-1940). He graduated from Cincinnati High School in Cincinnati in Washington County near Fayetteville, Arkansas.

Bond served in the United States Army during World War I. He attended the University of Arkansas at Fayetteville and University of Chicago, from which he obtained a master's degree in 1923. Bond married the former Mary Elizabeth Bost (1898-1997), also a native of Summers. She was a Latin teacher.

Academic career
Bond first taught in the towns of Springdale and Cane Hill, which are also in Washington County. He moved to Bauxite, where he was superintendent of the public schools in Saline County in central Arkansas. He next served as a principal in Texarkana.

In 1924, he relocated to Ruston, Louisiana to become an education professor at Louisiana Tech. He was selected as the university's eighth president, serving from 1928 to 1936. While president, he continued to work on his Ph.D. from the University of Chicago. He resigned from Louisiana Tech before completing his terminal degree.

Two weeks before leaving Louisiana Tech, Bond broke ground for the new $421,000 administration building known first as Leche Hall, after Governor Richard Leche, and then renamed for John Ephraim Keeny, the sixth president of Louisiana Tech.

The Minden Herald in Minden, Louisiana, reported in 1936 that Bond left Ruston to enroll in the doctoral program at Columbia University in New York City.

From 1944 to 1945, Bond was the acting fourth president at Southeastern Louisiana University in Hammond.

Later years
In later life, Bond and his wife Mary Elizabeth lived in Searcy and Fayetteville, Arkansas, where they engaged in gardening, travel, and entertaining. They were members of the Presbyterian Church. He also was a member of the Masonic lodge. Mary Elizabeth was widowed and survived her husband by 23 years, continuing to live in Fayetteville. Both are interred there at Fairview Memorial Gardens.

References

External links
George W. Bond, Find-a-Grave 
Mary Elizabeth Bost Bond, Find-a-Grave 
 

 

1891 births
1974 deaths
People from Washington County, Arkansas
University of Arkansas alumni
University of Chicago alumni
Educators from Louisiana
Presidents of Louisiana Tech University
People from Ruston, Louisiana
People from Hammond, Louisiana
People from Bauxite, Arkansas
People from White County, Arkansas
People from Fayetteville, Arkansas
American Presbyterians
United States Army soldiers
United States Army personnel of World War I
20th-century American academics